
Gmina Ciężkowice is an urban-rural gmina (administrative district) in Tarnów County, Lesser Poland Voivodeship, in southern Poland.

The gmina contains part of the protected area called Ciężkowice-Rożnów Landscape Park.

Villages
Apart from the town of Ciężkowice, Gmina Ciężkowice contains the villages and settlements of Bogoniowice, Bruśnik, Falkowa, Jastrzębia, Kąśna Dolna, Kąśna Górna, Kipszna, Ostrusza, Pławna, Siekierczyna, Tursko and Zborowice.

Neighbouring gminas
Gmina Ciężkowice is bordered by the gminas of Bobowa, Gromnik, Korzenna, Moszczenica, Rzepiennik Strzyżewski and Zakliczyn.

References
Polish official population figures 2006

Ciezkowice
Tarnów County